Andreas Asimenos (born 7 February 2004) is a Cypriot footballer who plays as a midfielder for MEAP Nisou on loan from Omonia.

Honours
Omonia
 Cypriot Cup: 2021–22
 Cypriot Super Cup: 2021

References

External links

Cypriot footballers
2004 births
Living people
Association football midfielders
AC Omonia players